A Treaty of Paris was signed on 24 August 1801 between Napoleonic France and Duke Maximilian I of Bavaria, after the French victory in the War of the Second Coalition.

France obtained the Palatinate territories, at time a Bavarian dependency, on the West Bank of the Rhine, notably the Duchy of Jülich and the County Palatine of Zweibrücken. However, Napoleon was not interested to humiliate the Wittelsbachs, a secondary opponent that could become a possible ally against the main enemy Austria. More, since the beginning of his reign the Bavarian Duke had searched favorable exchanges for his divided hereditary domains, so Napoleon offered an indemnity in Germany to Bavaria in event of a French friendliness, and so it happened.

References 
French 

Treaties of France
Treaties of Bavaria
North Rhine-Westphalia